The 1984 Kvalserien was the 10th edition of the Kvalserien. It determined which team of the participating ones would play in the 1984–85 Elitserien season and which three teams would play in the 1984–85 Swedish Division 1 season.

Tournament

External links
Tournament on hockeyarchives.info

Kvalserien
Kval